Alexander Andreyevich Rasskazov (1832, Moscow, Imperial Russia, — 28 July 1902, Moscow) was a Russian stage actor, one of the stars of the Moscow's Maly Theatre of his time, best remembered for his comic and vaudevillian parts, and considered an heir to Sergey Vasilyev's artistic legacy as well as the classic set of parts associated with the latter. He left Maly due to poor health but soon made himself a name as theatre entrepreneur in the Russian province, mostly in Samara, Tula, Kaluga and Simbirsk.

References 

19th-century male actors from the Russian Empire
Male actors from Moscow
1832 births
1902 deaths
Russian male stage actors